Joel James Gretsch (born December 20, 1963) is an American actor.  He is best known for his roles on The 4400, Taken and V.

Early life
Gretsch was born in St. Cloud, Minnesota, and grew up in Albany, Minnesota, the son of Russ and Barb. He has a sister, Jane, and a brother, Steve. Gretsch was raised Roman Catholic.

Career
Gretsch studied acting at the Guthrie Theater in Minneapolis before moving to Los Angeles in 1989. His stage work includes roles in Molière's Tartuffe and John Patrick Shanley's Danny and the Deep Blue Sea.

He started his television work in the early 1990s, appearing in episodes of Married... with Children, Melrose Place, Friends and Saved by the Bell: The New Class. Since then he has appeared in episodes of JAG, Silk Stalkings, CSI: Miami, CSI: NY, Burn Notice, and NCIS. More recently, he played a wealthy advertising executive and husband of a supermodel on an episode of Law & Order: Criminal Intent. He also had two guest appearances on NBC's Journeyman, playing the father of protagonist Dan Vasser.

Gretsch has also had supporting roles in a number of films including playing Bobby Jones in The Legend of Bagger Vance (2000), Minority Report (2002), The Emperor's Club (2002) and National Treasure: Book of Secrets (2007).

In 2008, Gretsch had a recurring role as Pete Raynor, Lindsay Boxer's love interest, on the television series Women's Murder Club.

Some of his notable roles include Tom Baldwin on the USA Network series The 4400 in which he starred alongside actress Jacqueline McKenzie, and as Owen Crawford in Steven Spielberg's 2002 science fiction miniseries Taken. Gretsch reunited with Scott Peters (creator of The 4400) on his remake of V. Gretsch played priest and resistance fighter Father Jack Landry in the series.

He guest starred in the new Diablo Cody created Emmy Award nominated Showtime Comedy-Drama The United States of Tara in the 1st season's last two episodes.

Personal life 
Gretsch has been married to actress Melanie Shatner since September 5, 1999. They have two daughters: Kaya (born 2002), and Willow (born 2005).

Filmography

Film

Television

References

External links

1963 births
Male actors from Minnesota
American male film actors
American male television actors
Living people
People from St. Cloud, Minnesota
People from Albany, Minnesota
20th-century American male actors
21st-century American male actors